Benjamin ("Big Ben") Brain (1753 – 8 April 1794) was a bareknuckle prizefighter who took the championship of all England in 1791 against the reigning champion Tom Johnson.

A collier by trade, he was a valiant fighter whose career spanned twenty years.

Early life and boxing career
Brain was born in Bristol, England, in 1753.  His surname was "Bryan" or "Brian": later in life this was sometimes corrupted into "Bryant" and also "Brain".

Prior to moving to London in 1774 in order to work as a coal porter at a wharf he had already defeated Jack Clayton, the champion of Kingswood, Bristol. and also a fighter called Harris.

His career as a professional started on 31 October 1786 at Long Fields, when he fought John Boone, who was known as "The Fighting Grenadier". Toughs broke into the ring and ganged up on Brain. In the resulting melée, Brain suffered a beating that almost closed one of his eyes. When order was restored and a surgeon had lanced the swelling around the eye, he resumed fighting and within thirty minutes had forced Boone to quit in defeat.

Cancellation of first bout with English champion Tom Johnson, 1789
After soundly defeating William Corbally in 20 minutes on 31 December 1788 in Navestock, he finally received a scheduled contract to fight the English champion, Tom Johnson for a prize of £500 the following year. When Brain fell ill and cancelled the bout, he forfeited the £100 he had put up for the fight. Later in that year he was well enough to fight Jacombs at Banbury, winning in 36 rounds.

In 1790 his 100 guinea fight against Bill Hooper at Newbury turned into a farce. Hooper became fearful after Brain's first successful hit on him and resorted to tactics such as falling over and spitting water in his face in order to distract him. The fight lasted over three hours and 180 rounds before being declared a draw due to the darkness of evening setting in. Hooper had fallen 133 times during the fight.

Retaining English championship against Tom Johnson, 1791
Brain then got another opportunity to fight Tom Johnson on 17 January 1791, at Wrotham in Kent. He received 500 guineas by the Duke of Hamilton for the bout.  The fight was a brutal but short-lived affair: despite being a 7–4 favourite, Johnson was incapacitated after 21 minutes, after he broke a finger by hitting a rail that surrounded the ring.  Nonetheless, Brain was winning prior to the injury, and was allowed to retain his claim to the championship with his eighteen-round win, in twenty-one minutes.

English championship becomes vacant, death and burial, 1792–4

Soon after winning the championship, and with no challengers coming forward, Brain retired from boxing and his title of English Champion became vacant.  It was next taken by boxer Daniel Mendoza, author of The Art of Boxing whose writing greatly added science to the sport. There were attempts to arrange a fight against Isaac Perrins but these came to nothing and until 1794 Brain made his living by sparring and acting as a second to other fighters until 1794.

On 24 February 1794, he was scheduled to fight William Wood but then died, of a "scirrhous liver", on 8 April, at his house on Gray's Inn Road, London before the bout could take place.  He was buried at St. Sepulchre's Church, London, and his funeral was attended by four fighters: William Wood, Tom Johnson, Bill Warr and John Symonds. The epitaph on his headstone reads:

Boxing achievements and honors

|-

|-

External Sources
Section on Brain in Pugilistica, the History of British Boxing, volume 1, 1906, Henry Downes Miles

References

1753 births
1794 deaths
Bare-knuckle boxers
Sportspeople from Bristol
English miners
English male boxers